John Eugene Blount (born July 12, 1954) is a former American football quarterback in the National Football League (NFL). He was drafted by the Oakland Raiders in the second round of the 1976 NFL Draft. He played college football at Tulsa, where he completed 320 of 588 passes for 4,372 yards and 35 touchdowns in three seasons as a starter. He was an honorable mention All-American, and American Bowl MVP following his senior season. He claimed to have developed his passing accuracy while herding cattle on his parents' ranch. He would spook the lead bull by hitting him in the head with a football, at which point the entire herd would follow. He lives in Longview, Texas.

Blount spent the 1976 season on injured reserve with an ankle injury. He was waived prior to the 1977 NFL season. He was claimed by several teams, but the NFL awarded the Tampa Bay Buccaneers his rights. The Bucs were short at quarterback, having suffered a string of quarterback injuries during the preseason. This resulted in a starting opportunity for Blount, who beat Parnell Dickinson for the third quarterback spot and rotated at starting quarterback with Gary Huff and Randy Hedberg throughout the 1977 season.

Blount was inducted into the Tulsa Hall of Fame in its 2021 Class. Blount was inducted with basketball coach Tubby Smith, Michelle Sechser (rowing), Chris O’Hare (men’s track and cross country) and Ryan Pore (men’s soccer) – along with the 1971 Tulsa baseball team.

Blount is one of four Longview High School graduates to play in a Super Bowl.

References

1953 births
Living people
American football quarterbacks
Oakland Raiders players
Tampa Bay Buccaneers players
Tulsa Golden Hurricane football players
Longview High School alumni
People from Longview, Texas
Sportspeople from Tyler, Texas
Players of American football from Texas